Body Complete is a 2012 film with an international cast by the producers Robert Hofferer and Lukas Sturm as well as the co-producer Puls 4 from 2011. Lukas Sturm directed the film and also wrote the script. Asli Bayram plays the leading role.

Background
The film deals with the impact of the Bosnian War on society. The ethnic cleansing  during this cruel war in the center of Europe happened in the sphere of influence of two men: former politician Radovan Karadžić, accused of being a war criminal, and former general Ratko Mladić, who was caught during the shooting of this film. Mladić is being held responsible for the mass murder of at least 8,000 unarmed Bosnian civilians in Srebrenica in July 1995. The story of the film is set in this historical background.

The filming mainly took place at authentic settings in Sarajevo and its surroundings. The former Bosnian commander and defender of Sarajevo, Mirsad Ćatić, acted as advisor for military history and appeared in a guest role. Research assistants under the supervision of Kathryne Bomberger from ICMP (International Commission on Missing Persons) in Sarajevo gave the producers and actors advice concerning forensic anthropology and DNA identification of the victims found in the mass graves. The organisation "Women of Srebrenica", regularly staging demonstrations to ensure that the search for lost men, children and relatives will continue, travelled to Sarajevo to play a part in one of the key scenes of the film.

Cast
Asli Bayram as Nicole
Senad Bašić as Murat
Adnan Hasković as Slobodan
Miraj Grbić as Mayor
Adi Hrustemović as Branko
James Hallett as George
Jan Henrik Stahlberg as Phillip
Anne Mertin as Dr. Mertens
Amel Bečić as Bojan
Marija Omaljev-Grbić as Alma
Mirsad Tuka as Doctor

External links

    Privatsender Puls4 fördert heimischen Film.  Wiener Zeitung, 14.06.2011 
PULS 4 investiert mit "Body Complete" in österreichischen Film. Wien, 10. Juni 2011. 

Austrian war drama films
2012 films
2010s thriller films
Bosnian War films
Films set in Sarajevo
Cultural depictions of Radovan Karadžić
Cultural depictions of Ratko Mladić